Hatto may refer to:

Hattō, Tottori, a town in Japan

People
Hatto I (c. 850–913), German Roman Catholic bishop
Hatto II (died 970), German Roman Catholic bishop
Hatto, Bishop of Passau (fl. 806–817) German Roman Catholic bishop
Hatto of Fulda, abbot of Fulda between 842 and 856; see Candidus of Fulda
Haito (763–after 824), German Roman Catholic bishop
Hatto Ständer (1929–2000), German musician and composer

People with the surname
Arthur Thomas Hatto (1910–2010), English scholar of German studies and husband of Margot Hatto
Jeanne Hatto (1879–1958), French operatic soprano
Joyce Hatto (1928–2006), British pianist
Margot Hatto (1911–2000), German business owner and wife of Arthur Thomas Hatto
Tommy Hatto, British actor